Mix FM Lebanon (104.4 - 104.7 MHz FM) is a radio station serving Beirut, Zahle, and  Lebanon. The radio station's studios are located in Beirut. It is owned by Lebanese DJ Rodge (Roger Saad), and airs new and trending . first broadcast on 23 February 1996.

Mix FM mainly broadcasts new and trending music. The station also broadcasts exclusive national and international shows in the morning, afternoon, and weekend nights.

Number one songs by year
These songs hit #1 on Mix FM's Top 100 Songs:

1996: Coolio - "Gangsta's Paradise"
1997: Puff Daddy - "I'll Be Missing You"
1998: Celine Dion - "My Heart Will Go On"
1999: Britney Spears - "...Baby One More Time"
2000: Madonna – “Music”
2001: Kylie Minogue – “Can't Get You Out of My Head”
2002: Las Ketchup – “Asereje”
2003: Beyoncé and Jay-Z – “Crazy In Love”
2004: Usher ft. Ludacris and Lil Jon - “Yeah!”
2005: Madonna – “Hung Up”
2006: Shakira ft. Wyclef Jean - “Hips Don't Lie”
2007: Yves Larock ft Jaba – “Rise Up”
2008: Guru Josh Project – “Infinity”
2009: The Black Eyed Peas - “I Gotta Feeling”
2010: Rihanna & Eminem - “Love the Way You Lie”
2011: Adele - “Rolling in the Deep”
2012: Fun. feat. Janelle Monáe - “We Are Young”
2013: Avicii feat. Aloe Blacc - “Wake Me Up”
2014: John Legend - “All Of Me”
2015: Adele - “Hello”
2016: Sia - “Cheap Thrills”
2017: Ed Sheeran - “Shape of You”
2018: Maroon 5 feat. Cardi B - “Girls Like You”
2019: Shawn Mendes & Camila Cabello - “Señorita”

Shows and Programs
Clint Maximus in the Morning, Monday to Friday, 7am till 10am
80's at 8 (Part of Clint Maximus in the Morning), 8am – 9amNemr in the Afternoon, Monday to Friday, 5pm till 7pmThe Retro Years, Thursday, 8pm – 9pmClub Frequency with maDJam, Friday, 10pm – 11pmHardwell on Air, Friday, 11pm – 1amThe Edge Radio Show with Clint Maximus, Friday night / Saturday morning, Starting 02amThe Mix FM Top 20, Saturday and Sunday, (2pm – 3pm Sat) (8pm – 9pm Sun)The Weekend Powermix with Rodge, 6pm – 7pm Saturday and SundayTim live, Saturday, 9pm – 10pmA State of Trance with Armin van Buuren, Saturday, 10pm – 12amClub Life by Tiësto, Saturday night / Sunday Morning, 12am – 2amDrumcode with Adam Beyer, Saturday night / Sunday morning, 2am – 4amMix FM Sunday Brunch, Sunday, noon – 1amThe Official Lebanese Top 20, Mondays at 7pmThe Mix FM Road ShowCurrent HostsClint MaximusNemrJohn Saad''' (Replacing Clint Maximus in the Official Lebanese Top 20)

References

External links
 Mix FM Website
Mix FM Instagram
Mix FM Facebook

1996 establishments in Lebanon
Radio stations established in 1996
Radio stations in Lebanon